Temnora argyropeza is a moth of the family Sphingidae. It is known from Madagascar.

It is very similar to Temnora marginata marginata, but the forewing upperside is lacking the pale oblique line. The hindwing upperside is entirely dark orange-brown, lacking a brown marginal band but thinly edged with blackish-brown.

References

Temnora
Moths described in 1879
Moths of Madagascar
Taxa named by Paul Mabille